The HP Slate 500 is a multi-touch capable Windows 7 tablet computer that was announced at CES 2010 and launched on 22 October 2010.

History 
The Slate 500 began as an e-reader concept,  but after further study of the uses for such devices, HP realigned their goal to deliver a product that provided a "rich user experience; to browse, listen to music, watch videos and enjoy media".

HP Chief Technology Officer, Phil McKinney, stated that "2010 is the optimal year...there is now this convergence of low cost, low power processors, with an Operating System - Windows 7 that is touch aware."

Hardware 
The Slate 500 has a three-megapixel camera on its back panel and a VGA resolution webcam on the front panel, an 8.9" capacitive multi-touch screen supporting 1024×600 pixel resolution with digitizer and pen support. The Slate is powered by a 1.86 GHz Intel Atom Z540 processor with 2GB DDR2 of RAM, 64GB of onboard solid state flash storage and one standard USB 2.0 port. The device supports 1080p playback powered by the Intel GMA 500 integrated graphics chipset in addition to a Broadcom Crystal HD media accelerator card for hardware assisted video playback. Wireless capabilities include the built-in WiFi and Bluetooth support. Power is supplied by a 2-cell 30WHr lithium-polymer battery with an average runtime of 5 hours.

The Slate 500 also has support for a stylus pen/digitizer, to enable on-screen freehand drawing and writing.

Software 
The Slate 500 runs Windows 7, which includes native touch technology. Adobe Systems and HP confirmed that the "full web" experience will be available on the Slate 500, including full hardware accelerated Adobe Flash content and Adobe AIR applications.

When upgraded to Windows 8, the display resolution will preclude the use of the tiled interface. However, with a driver from Intel, resolution can be changed to 1024 x 768 which is the minimum value for Modern interface.

Release 
HP announced that the device was available for purchase on 22 October 2010, initially with a cost of US$799. A month after launch, HP announced that the device was back ordered for six weeks due to "extraordinary demand", though Engadget claimed that a source said that HP had planned to build only 5,000 Slates, but received orders for 9,000, forcing the delay.

Reception
The Slate 500 (at the time known simply as the Slate) received a positive reception when it was shown at CES 2010.  CNBC said "HP's Slate has been the big buzz".

Initial reviews have not met a general consensus yet.  CNET said the device was a "lightweight, sturdy device, with...a slick industrial design and several hardware advantages over the iPad." Its only criticism was the lack of a specialized interface for touchscreen use; rather, the Slate has no additional software beyond what is included with Windows 7 Professional, and the CNET review considered this a limitation for productivity uses.

See also
 HP Slate 7
 HP Touchpad

References

External links
 Official Site
 HP Slate YouTube Page
 Installing Linux Mint 12 on HP Slate 500

Slate 500
Microsoft Tablet PC